Raymond Michael Charles Hiron (22 July 1943 – 5 April 2020) was an English footballer who played in the Football League for Portsmouth and Reading and in non-league football for Fareham Town.

Hiron died on 5 April 2020, at the age of 76.

References

1943 births
2020 deaths
People from Gosport
English footballers
Association football forwards
Fareham Town F.C. players
Portsmouth F.C. players
Reading F.C. players
English Football League players